Kwaku Frimpong (born 6 November 2002) is a Welsh professional footballer who plays as a midfielder for Metropolitan Police, on loan from  club AFC Wimbledon. He had played on loan at Leatherhead, Carshalton Athletic, Dartford and Potters Bar Town.

Career
Frimpong joined the Academy at AFC Wimbledon at the age of sixteen upon the recommendation of Ben Thatcher, after being released by Crystal Palace academy and signed his first professional contract with the club in July 2021. He enjoyed a loan spell at Leatherhead in the first half of the 2021–22 season, which Wimbledon loan manager Michael Hamilton described as "testing... including having to fight for a place in the team, adjust to different managers, and display good resilience". He joined another Isthmian League Premier Division club Carshalton Athletic on loan on 3 January 2022. He scored his first goal at a senior level on 22 January, in a 5–4 defeat at Cray Wanderers. However he tore his retinaculum in February, which saw him sidelined for two months, before he returned to fitness and enjoyed a "strong finish to the season".

He made his first-team debut for AFC Wimbledon on 30 August 2022, when he came on as an 82nd-minute substitute for Paul Osew in a 2–1 defeat to Aston Villa U21. On 11 September, he joined National League South club Dartford on a one month loan. He played 34 minutes for the club in a 3–1 win at Dover Athletic two days later. He was sent off in an FA Cup second qualifying round defeat to Beckenham Town. He scored his first goal for AFC Wimbledon on 20 September, in a 3–2 home win over Crawley Town in the EFL Trophy; he started the game at right wing-back and played his first full ninety minutes for the club. He made his EFL League Two debut on 22 October, in a 2–1 win at Rochdale. He had been called into the matchday squad by manager Johnnie Jackson following an injury to George Marsh. Following a month loan spell with Potters Bar Town, Frimpong joined Metropolitan Police on loan until the end of the season in February 2023.

Style of play
The AFC Wimbledon website describes Frimpong as a "tough-tackling midfielder".

Career statistics

References

2002 births
Living people
Footballers from Cardiff
Welsh footballers
Association football midfielders
AFC Wimbledon players
Leatherhead F.C. players
Carshalton Athletic F.C. players
Dartford F.C. players
Potters Bar Town F.C. players
Metropolitan Police F.C. players
Isthmian League players
National League (English football) players
English Football League players
Welsh people of Ghanaian descent
Black British sportspeople